Edward George Huia Baker (15 September 1895 – 15 May 1962) was a New Zealand cricketer. He played in four first-class matches for Wellington from 1919 to 1921.

Baker was born on 15 September 1895 in Ōtaki. His parents were Edward and Margaret Riddel	Baker.

Baker died on 15 May 1962 in Christchurch. His wife, Vera Alma Baker, had died before him. He was buried at Memorial Park Cemetery.

See also
 List of Wellington representative cricketers

References

External links
 

1895 births
1962 deaths
New Zealand cricketers
Wellington cricketers
People from Ōtaki, New Zealand
Burials at Memorial Park Cemetery, Christchurch